Puto is a 1987 Filipino teen fantasy comedy film directed by Leroy Salvador and starring Herbert Bautista as the titular character, alongside Janno Gibbs, Mia Prats, Dennis Da Silva, Bing Loyzaga, Jigo Garcia, Gelie de Belen, Jayjay Salvador, and Cathy Mora. It is Bautista's first film to feature him in the solo lead role. Produced by Viva Films, the film was released on November 4, 1987, and was a box office success.

Luciano E. Soriano gave the film a mixed review, praising Bautista's performance while having middling feelings about the supporting cast and some gaps in logic.

Plot
Ivanhoe "Puto" de la Cruz is a young puto vendor who dreams of being with Gina, his classmate at the Andres Bonifacio High School. After accidentally rescuing three little elves (Elvis, Boy George, and Travolta), he is granted a week-long chance to wish for anything he wants., culminating in the rescue of Gina from a band of kidnappers. Puto's powers expire during a running competition, but he manages to win and gain the respect of everyone in school.

Cast

Herbert Bautista as Ivanhoe "Puto" de la Cruz
Janno Gibbs as Juanito
Mia Prats as Gina
Dennis Da Silva as Danny
Bing Loyzaga as Tere
Jigo Garcia as Sonny
Gelie de Belen as Mindy
Jayjay Salvador as Charlie
Cathy Mora as Kathy
Marita Zobel as Aling Loleng
Berting Labra as Travolta
Max Alvarado as Elvis
Cachupoy as Boy George
Chris Villanueva as Johnny

Release
Puto was given a "G" rating by the Movie and Television Review and Classification Board (MTRCB), which stands for "General Patronage", and was released by Viva Films on November 4, 1987. The film was a success at the box office.

Critical response
Luciano E. Soriano of the Manila Standard gave the film a mixed review, questioning some of the film's gaps in logic such as whether the school attended by Puto, a poor vendor, is public despite the presence of rich students, as well as why the elves need someone to rescue them when they can transform into animals and easily escape. Soriano also wrote that the film's situations "are standard fare among youth-oriented movies", and that the supporting cast were unmemorable in their roles, though he commended Bautista by stating that "it is as clear as daylight that this is Bautista's show all the way."

References

External links

1987 films
1987 fantasy films
1980s fantasy comedy films
1980s teen comedy films
1987 comedy films
Filipino-language films
Films shot in Metro Manila
Philippine comedy films
Philippine fantasy films
Philippine fantasy comedy films